Paradises, stylized as PARADISES was a Japanese alternative idol girl group formed in 2020 after the split of Gang Parade. The group ceased activities as Paradises and resumed activities as Gang Parade at the beginning of 2022.

History

2020: Formation and Paradises
Following the announcement of Saki Kamiya's graduation from Gang Parade, it was announced that Gang Parade would split into two groups: Go to the Beds, consisting of Miki Yamamachi, Yua Yumeno, Can GP Maika, Yui Ga Dockson and Coco Partin Coco, and Paradises, consisting of Yuka Terashima, Usagi Tsukino, Naruhaworld. They released the split EP, G/P, consisting of three songs per group and Saki Kamiya's final solo song on April 1, 2020. Kila May joined the group on May 22. They released their eponymous debut album on July 22. On December 26, Utauuta joined the group and Usagi Tsukino went on a six-month hiatus.

2021–2022: Compilation albums, Paradises Return, line-up swap and return to Gang Parade
On January 30, 2021, the group released the compilation album, Paradises (Refresh Ver.), which featured all of their previous songs with the addition of new member Utauuta and the exception of Usagi Tsukino who was on hiatus at the time. They released their first solo EP, Paradises Return, on March 3. On March 27, it was announced that a new member, Ca Non, would join the group. She made her first appearance as a member on April 28. On July 1, Usagi Tsukino returned from her six-month hiatus and a second compilation album, Paradises (Free Ver.), was released which featured all of the group's previous songs with all current Paradises members present. On July 9, Utauuta left the group due to difference in opinion of the direction the group was going in. They released their first single, on July 28. On October 2, it was announced that all members of Paradises and Go to the Beds would immediately swap groups. They released a second split EP, G⇔P, on December 15. On January 2, 2022, Paradises ceased activities and returned to Gang Parade.

Members

Initial line-up

Former

Swap line-up

Timeline

Discography

Studio albums

Compilation albums

Extended plays

Singles

As lead artist

Collaborations

References

Japanese idol groups
Japanese pop music groups
Musical groups established in 2020
Musical groups from Tokyo
2020 establishments in Japan